This is the discography for British singer Luciana.

Albums 
1994: One More River
2008: Featuring Luciana

Singles

As lead artist 

Notes
A "What Goes Around" was released as a double A-side with "One More River".
B  Remake of "Yeah Yeah" by Bodyrox feat. Luciana.

Other songs

with Bodyrox

As featured artist

References 

Discographies of British artists
Electronic music discographies